"Border Song" is a song by Elton John with music by John and lyrics by Bernie Taupin. The song initially appeared on the 1970 album Elton John, and was released in the spring of 1970 as the LP's first single. After failing to chart in the UK, it was released in North America a few months later. It met with more success there, especially in Canada, where it peaked at No. 34. The appearance of "Border Song" on the Canadian charts was John's first chart appearance in any country.

"Border Song" was also John's first song to chart in the United States, peaking at No. 92 on the Billboard Hot 100 and No. 69 in the Cash Box Top 100 in October 1970. A cover by soul icon Aretha Franklin (with "Holy Moses" following the title in parentheses to reflect the repeated phrase in the song) fared better reaching No. 37 in the Billboard Hot 100 and No. 23 in the Cash Box Top 100 in December 1970. It was included as the closing track of Aretha's 1972 Young, Gifted and Black album as well.

In the Netherlands it peaked at No. 29 in the Dutch Top 40 in January 1971.

Music and lyrics

The song's melody is similar to that of a spiritual. A choir sings during an instrumental break led by John's piano.

John has said that the song is about the alienation Taupin felt in and about London at the time and his desire to visit home as often as he could. John determined the song was too short and added the final verse himself.

Format and track list
1970 US/Canadian 7" single
 "Border Song" 3:22
 "Bad Side of the Moon" 3:15

Personnel
 Elton John – piano, lead vocals
 Madeline Bell – backing vocals
 Tony Burrows – backing vocals
 Roger Cook – backing vocals
 Brian Dee – organ
 Lesley Duncan – backing vocals
 Kay Garner – backing vocals
 Colin Green – guitar
 Tony Hazzard – backing vocals
 Clive Hicks – guitar
 Barry Morgan – drums
 Dave Richmond – bass
Choir led by Barbara Moore
Arranged and conducted by Paul Buckmaster

Cover versions

 Aretha Franklin's 1972 album Young, Gifted and Black concludes with her solo cover of this song.  Cash Box said of this version that Franklin "brings the song to a boil in an almost-spiritual arrangement of the Elton John hit."
 Elton John and Aretha Franklin performed the song together on Franklin's 1993 Duets special.
 In 1996, Sophie B. Hawkins recorded the song for the soundtrack of the movie The Associate.
 Willie Nelson covered the song on the 2018 John-Taupin tribute album Restoration.
 Italian singer Mia Martini recorded in 1972 this song in Italian, with the title as "Io straniera".

B-side

The song's B-side, "Bad Side of the Moon", was subsequently covered by April Wine, whose version is on the album On Record and was released as their second single from that album, and by Toe Fat, whose version appears on their self-titled debut album and was also released as a single. The song became a big hit in Canada, reaching No. 16 there.

References

1970 songs
1970 singles
Songs with lyrics by Bernie Taupin
Songs with music by Elton John
Elton John songs
Aretha Franklin songs
Atlantic Records singles
DJM Records singles
Uni Records singles
Song recordings produced by Gus Dudgeon
Song recordings produced by Jerry Wexler
Song recordings produced by Arif Mardin
Songs against racism and xenophobia